Charles Lawrence Brewster (December 27, 1916 – October 1, 2000) was a right-handed shortstop in Major League Baseball for the Chicago Cubs, Cincinnati Reds, Philadelphia Phillies, and Cleveland Indians. He also made two appearances as a second baseman in his brief career.

Early life and minor leagues
Brewster played college baseball at Southern Arkansas University. His minor league career began with the Class-D Abbeville A's in 1936. He gradually moved his way up the minor league ranks, and throughout the war years spent most of his time with the Nashville Sounds.

Cincinnati
Cincinnati originally obtained Brewster through the Rule 5 Draft, selecting him from a Milwaukee minor league team in 1942. He debuted with the Reds on May 2, 1943, going 1-for-8 at the plate in seven games with the club. Cincinnati quickly traded Brewster to the Phillies on June 6 in exchange for Dain Clay.

Philadelphia
With Philadelphia, Brewster found a job as a shortstop, platooning with Glen Stewart. His bat was light, however; in 49 games he hit just .220 and managed only two extra-base hits (both doubles) and 12 RBI.

Chicago and Cleveland
Brewster surfaced with the Cubs in 1944, appearing in ten games and hitting .250 (11-for-44) with two doubles and 2 RBI. After going missing from the major leagues for a year, he had a brief stint with Cleveland in 1946, going 0-for-2 in three games. His final major league appearance was on May 29, 1946, and he played in the minor leagues until his retirement in 1954. Brewster died on October 1, 2000 in Alma, Georgia.

References

External links

 Stats at The Baseball Cube

1916 births
2000 deaths
Baseball players from Louisiana
Chicago Cubs players
Philadelphia Phillies players
Cleveland Indians players
Cincinnati Reds players
Major League Baseball shortstops
Abbeville A's players
Savannah Indians players
Waycross Bears players
Atlanta Crackers players
Durham Bulls players
Nashville Vols players
Los Angeles Angels (minor league) players
Milwaukee Brewers (minor league) players
Rochester Red Wings players
St. Hyacinthe Saints players
Gainesville G-Men players
Leesburg Packers players
DeLand Red Hats players